Cirripectes springeri, Springer's blenny or the spotted eyelash blenny, is a species of combtooth blenny found in coral reefs in the western Pacific ocean.  This species reaches a length of  TL. The specific name honours the American ichthyologist Victor G. Springer of the United States National Museum who has worked extensively on blennies.

References

springeri
Taxa named by Jeffrey T. Williams
Fish described in 1988